The 2021 Women's Euro Beach Soccer League was the first edition of the Women's Euro Beach Soccer League (WEBSL). It is the annual, premier competition in European beach soccer contested between women's national teams, succeeding the Women's Euro Beach Soccer Cup (2016–19). Organised by Beach Soccer Worldwide (BSWW), it is the women's version of the men's long-running Euro Beach Soccer League, which began in 1998.

The league consisted of two phases: a single round of fixtures comprising the regular season, which determined the seedings for the post-season event, the Superfinal, in which the teams then directly contested the league title, with the winners becoming WEBSL champions; both events took place in Portugal.

Russia were defending European champions, having won the final edition of the Women's Euro Beach Soccer Cup in 2019, and successfully retained their European crown by winning the league title, beating England 8–2 in the final.

Teams
Eight teams took part in the inaugural season. Portugal entered straight into the Superfinal as hosts.

The numbers in parentheses show the European ranking of each team prior to the start of the season, out of 9 nations.

 (1st)
 (2nd)
 (3rd)
 (4th)
 (5th)
 (6th)
 (8th)
 (n/a)

Regular season (Nazaré, 17–20 June)
Matches are listed as local time in Nazaré, WEST (UTC+1)

The matches took place at one of two venues on Praia de Nazaré (Nazaré Beach): One seated arena, the Estádio do Viveiro (Viveiro Stadium), and one purpose made pitch, located adjacent to the main stadium, simply known as Pitch 2. Due to COVID-19 concerns, the matches were played behind closed doors.

All teams qualified for the Superfinal; the final standings of the regular season event were used to determine the seedings for the Superfinal.

Group stage

Group 1

Group 2

Play-offs

Final standings

Awards
The following were presented after the conclusion of the final day's matches.

Superfinal (Figueira da Foz, 9–12 September)
Matches are listed as local time in Figueira da Foz, WEST (UTC+1).

The winners of the Superfinal were crowned 2021 WEBSL champions.

Group stage

Group 1

Group 2

Play-off stage

Seventh place play-off

Fifth place play-off

Third place play-off

Superfinal match

Awards

Winners trophy

Individual awards
Awarded for feats achieved in the Superfinal only

Final standings

Top scorers
The following table list the top 10 scorers of the 2021 WEBSL, including goals scored in both the regular and post season events.

Note there are no awards presented for these season-encompassing scoring feats, the tables are for statistical purposes only. Scoring awards were bestowed per stage, with the primary award that which was presented in the Superfinal.

Sources: Regular season, Superfinal

See also
2021 Euro Beach Soccer League (men's)

References

External links
 Beach Soccer Worldwide (BSWW), official website
 Regular season, Nazaré
 Superfinal, Figueira da Foz

 Women's Euroleague 2021, at Beach Soccer Russia (in Russian)

Euro Beach Soccer League
Women's Euro Beach Soccer League
Women's Euro Beach Soccer League
Euro Beach Soccer League
Euro Beach Soccer League